The Prime Minister's Department  was an Australian government department that existed between July 1911 and March 1971.

History
The Prime Minister's Department was created in July 1911, initiated on a small scale compared to other government departments of the day. The department at its formation was placed under the charge of Malcolm Shepherd, who had been secretary to the Prime Minister for some years already. It had been speculated that the government would create such a department in media before its creation, including in May 1910.

In 1968, Prime Minister John Gorton split a section of the Prime Minister's Department off, to form the Department of the Cabinet Office with the responsibility to service the Cabinet and the committees of Cabinet.

By 1970, it had become apparent there was considerable unhappiness about the way the Prime Minister's Department was run. The following year, in March 1971, the department was abolished and its functions moved to the newly formed Department of the Prime Minister and Cabinet. The new department combined the functions of the Prime Minister's Department and the Department of the Cabinet Office. The Prime Minister of the day, William McMahon, told media that the former system with separate departments for Cabinet and for the Prime Minister, that had been operating since 1968, was inefficient.

Scope
Information about the department's functions and/or government funding allocation could be found in the Administrative Arrangements Orders, the annual Portfolio Budget Statements and in the department's annual reports.

In 1912, the department's functions were outlined in an Administrative Arrangements Order as:
Auditor-General and Staff
Communication with the Governor-General
Communication with the States
Officers of the Parliament
Public Service Commissioner and Staff (as from 1 July 1912) 
Royal Commissions
The Commonwealth of Australia Gazette
The Federal Executive Council

Structure
The department was a Commonwealth Public Service department, staffed by officials who were responsible to the Prime Minister of Australia.

References

Ministries established in 1911
Prime Minister's Department
1911 establishments in Australia
1971 disestablishments in Australia